The Marenka House is a historic house at 7300 Radcliffe Drive in College Park, Maryland.  Built in 1958, it is a distinctive local example of Modern Movement architecture.  It is a single-story brick structure in a basically rectangular form, with a broad low-pitch gabled roof.  It has projecting gable sections to the north and south, and an integrated garage.  The front projecting gable has floor-to-ceiling windows in its center, and a deep projecting eave.  Although its architect is unknown, it is considered one of the area's finest Mid-Century Modern houses, an application of Frank Lloyd Wright's principles of organic architecture.

The house was listed on the National Register of Historic Places in 2017.

References

Houses in Prince George's County, Maryland
Houses on the National Register of Historic Places in Maryland
Houses completed in 1958
National Register of Historic Places in Prince George's County, Maryland
College Park, Maryland